Junius Foy Guin Jr. (February 2, 1924 – November 8, 2016) was a United States district judge of the United States District Court for the Northern District of Alabama.

Education and career

Born in Russellville, Alabama, Guin was an infantry officer in the United States Army during World War II; he served from 1943 to 1946, and achieved the rank of Lieutenant. He received a Juris Doctor from the University of Alabama School of Law in 1947, and was in private practice in Russellville from 1948 to 1973. He received an  degree from the University of Alabama in 1975.

Federal judicial service

On March 20, 1973, Guin was nominated by President Richard Nixon to a seat on the United States District Court for the Northern District of Alabama vacated by Judge Clarence W. Allgood. Guin was confirmed by the United States Senate on April 10, 1973, and received his commission on April 18, 1973. He assumed senior status on February 3, 1989, and died at the age of 92 on November 8, 2016.

References

External links
 

1924 births
2016 deaths
Judges of the United States District Court for the Northern District of Alabama
United States district court judges appointed by Richard Nixon
20th-century American judges
People from Russellville, Alabama
University of Alabama School of Law alumni
University of Alabama alumni
United States Army officers